Emma Louise Arbuthnot, Baroness Arbuthnot of Edrom  (née Broadbent), known professionally as Mrs Justice Arbuthnot, is a British High Court judge.

Early life and education
Emma Louise Broadbent, daughter of wine critic Michael Broadbent, was born in Macclesfield on the 9th of January 1959 and grew up in London. She attended a fee-paying French state school. After a period in the workforce, she studied at London University, supporting herself by working as a cleaner, and graduated with a law degree. On 6 September 1984, she married James Arbuthnot, later Baron Arbuthnot of Edrom, a barrister and British Conservative Party politician.

Career
Arbuthnot became a barrister in 1986. She was appointed as a Deputy District Judge (Magistrates’ Courts) in 2000, a Recorder in 2001 (crime and then family), a full time District Judge (Magistrates' Courts) in 2005, the Deputy Senior District Judge (Chief Magistrate) in 2012, the Senior District Judge (Chief Magistrate) for England and Wales in 2016, and a Justice of the High Court of England and Wales in 2020.

Rulings as High Court Judge

Archie Battersbee 
Arbuthnot oversaw Archie Battersbee's case in the Family Division of the High Court in London. In a final hearing, which took place on 6 and 7 June 2022, she ruled that doctors could terminate the patient's treatment and end his life support. The family was given limited time to launch appeal proceedings. However, following another hearing, Arbuthnot granted the parents permission to take the case to the Court of Appeal. The Court of Appeal later ruled that the High Court should reconsider its opinion as to whether he was brain-dead, and that a new hearing of the Court of Appeal would be set for 11 July 2022. The Court of Appeal subsequently denied the appeal on 25 June 2022. The Court of Appeal agreed to stay their ruling for 48 hours to give Archie's parents time to ask for an appeal to the Supreme Court of the United Kingdom or to the European Court of Human Rights.

Rulings as Chief Magistrate

First unexplained wealth order
As Chief Magistrate, she made rulings related to the fugitive Indian tycoon Vijay Mallya, and Zamira Hajiyeva, the first person subject to an unexplained wealth order.

Julian Assange
Towards the end of 2019, Arbuthnot, who had presided at several of Julian Assange's extradition hearings, stepped aside because of a "perception of bias", apparently linked to her husband.

Uber
Uber’s application for a five-year licence was rejected by Transport for London in September 2017. In June 2018, Emma Arbuthnot granted Uber a probationary 15 month licence for London. An investigation by The Observer newspaper reported that Arbuthnot's husband, James Arbuthnot, was a director of SC Strategy Ltd. during Uber's appeal before his wife. SC Strategy Ltd is a private intelligence company which has worked for the sovereign wealth fund Qatar Investment Authority (QIA), one of the main investors in a $1.2bn financing arrangement for Uber. After The Observer's report was published, Lady Arbuthnot withdrew from hearing any further appeals by the company.

Grenfell
In August 2019 Arbuthnot cleared a man accused of filming a Grenfell Tower effigy being burned at a bonfire night party, whilst a group of friends laughed and joked.  Her decision was overturned by the High Court in August 2021.

References

Dames Commander of the Order of the British Empire
21st-century English judges
English women judges
Living people
Emma Arbuthnot
Arbuthnot of Edrum
Spouses of life peers
Lawyers from London
1959 births